is a 2016 Japanese comedy anime television series produced by Sunrise and NHK. The series premiered on October 8, 2016, on NHK E. A second season started airing on October 7, 2017.

Plot
Two high school students, Kanae Otowa and Sōsuke Kagura, live in a rural town that is attempting to reinvigorate their town with music. Otowa and Kagura notice one day that ClassicaLoids of Beethoven and Mozart have appeared. The two ClassicaLoids play music they refer to as "Musik", which Otowa and Kagura soon discover is a power that causes stars to fall and giant robots to appear, turning every day henceforth bewildered. Subsequently, ClassicaLoids of Chopin, Bach, Schubert and other renowned composers also start to appear. The power that the ClassicaLoids hold and their origin remains a mystery that is yet to be discovered.

Characters
Beethoven

Mozart

Chopin

Liszt

Schubert

Bach

Tchaikovsky

Bądarzewska

Pad-kun

Richard Wagner

Antonín Dvořák

Media

Anime
The anime began airing on October 8, 2016, on NHK E. In North America, Sentai Filmworks acquired the license for the anime series, and is simulcasting the series on Hulu, Anime Network and Crunchyroll. In Australia and New Zealand, the series is simulcast on AnimeLab. A second season began airing on October 7, 2017. The second season simulcasted in North America and other regions on Hidive.

Episode list

Second Season

Production
The series was announced in July 2015 as a collaboration between Sunrise and NHK. It is animated by Sunrise, directed by Yoichi Fujita and written by Miya Asakawa, Tsuyoshi Kida, Kyo Kogure, and Shū Matsubara, with Ichirō Sakaki and Michihiro Tsuchiya handling series composition. It features original character designs by Makoto Tsuchibayashi, adapted character designs by Seiichi Hashimoto, music by Masashi Hamauzu, and musical renditions by Daisuke Asakura, Tomoyasu Hotei, tofubeats and Tsunku for Liszt, Beethoven, Mozart and Bach, respectively. NHK and BN Pictures are the series' producers.

References

External links
 

Anime with original screenplays
Bandai Namco Pictures
Comedy anime and manga
Music in anime and manga
Madman Entertainment anime
2016 anime television series debuts
Male harem anime and manga
Sentai Filmworks
Sunrise (company)
NHK original programming
Cultural depictions of classical musicians